A sponsor or patron is a person, usually a legislator, who presents a bill or resolution to a legislature for consideration. Those who support it are known as cosponsors (sometimes co-sponsors) or copatrons.

U.S. Congress
A sponsor in the United States Congress is the first member of the House or Senate to be listed among the potentially numerous lawmakers who introduce a bill for consideration. Committees are occasionally identified as sponsors of legislation as well. A sponsor is also sometimes called a "primary sponsor." 

In contrast to a sponsor, a "cosponsor" is a senator or representative who adds their name as a supporter to the sponsor's bill. An "initial cosponsor" or "original cosponsor" is a senator or representative who was listed as a cosponsor at the time of a bill's introduction, rather than added as a cosponsor later on. A cosponsor added later is known as an "additional cosponsor". 

An unlimited number of cosponsors of a bill is permitted. Some bills have hundreds of cosponsors.

Footnotes

External links
 Congressional Research Service Report for Congress, Sponsorship and Cosponsorship of House Bills
Sponsor/Cosponsor Summaries from the Library of Congress: (2007-2008) , (2005-2006) , (2003-2004) , (2001-2002) , (1999-2000) ,(1997-1998) , (1995-1996) , (1993-1994) , (1991-1992) , (1989-1990) , (1987-1988) , (1985-1986) , (1983-1984) , (1981-1982) , (1979-1980) , (1977-1978) , (1977-1978) , and (1975-1976) .

Terminology of the United States Congress